Kingscote is a surname. Notable people with the surname include:

 Algernon Kingscote (1888–1964), British tennis player
 Arthur Kingscote (1841–1881), cricketer (son of Henry Robert and cousin of Henry Bloomfield Kingscote)
 Henry Bloomfield Kingscote (1843–1915), soldier and amateur cricketer
 Henry Robert Kingscote (1802–1882), philanthropist and amateur cricketer
 John Kingscote (consecrated 24 October 1462), Bishop of Carlisle
 Maurice John Kingscote (1887-1959), British polo champion
 Richard Kingscote (born 1986), British jockey
 Robert Kingscote (1830–1908), soldier and politician
 Thomas Kingscote (1845–1935), courtier

partial family tree: Kingscote Family